The Elizabeth B. Gowanlock House is a house in southeast Portland, Oregon listed on the National Register of Historic Places.

See also
 National Register of Historic Places listings in Southeast Portland, Oregon

References

Further reading

1908 establishments in Oregon
Houses completed in 1908
Houses on the National Register of Historic Places in Portland, Oregon
Portland Eastside MPS
Portland Historic Landmarks
Sunnyside, Portland, Oregon